Leonard I. Sweet  is an American theologian, semiotician, church historian, pastor, and author. Sweet currently serves as the E. Stanley Jones Professor Emeritus at Drew Theological School at Drew University, in Madison, New Jersey; Charles Wesley Distinguished Professor of Doctoral Studies at Evangelical Seminary; Distinguished Visiting Professor at Tabor College; and Visiting Distinguished Professor at George Fox University in Portland, Oregon. Sweet is ordained in the United Methodist Church.

Early life
Leonard Sweet was raised in the Methodist tradition, attending the Free Methodist Church and Pilgrim Holiness Church as a child.

Growing up, the Sweet family always attended Methodist watchnight services on New Year's Eve.

Academic engagements
Before his current seminary positions, Sweet had been E. Stanley Jones Professor of Evangelism, Vice President of Academic Affairs, and Dean of the Theological School at Drew from 1995 to 2015. Prior to his appointments at Drew University, he served as President and Professor of Church History at United Theological Seminary, Dayton, Ohio. His first academic administration position was as Provost and Associate Professor of Church History at Colgate Rochester Divinity School/Bexley Hall/Crozer Theological Seminary.

Sweet is founder and President of SpiritVenture Ministries and owner of the preaching resource website www.preachthestory.com. He also founded in 2020 a new publishing company called The Salish Sea Press. His writings focus on the study of Semiotics.

He is the author of more than sixty books, hundreds of articles (many of a scholarly and technical nature), and over 80 prefaces/forewords to others' books. He has published over 1500 sermons in the journal Homiletics, Preachingplus.com, sermons.com and preachthestory.com. In 2005, Sweet created the first open-source preaching website called Wikiletics.com. Sweet posts weekly podcasts on iTunes entitled Napkin Scribbles and posts on YouTube a weekly LenTalk.

Sweet has served a term on the council of the American Society of Church History and was an associate editor of the Journal of the American Academy of Religion for ten years. An honors and Phi Beta Kappa graduate of the University of Richmond, he earned his Master of Divinity degree from Colgate/Rochester/Bexley Hall/Crozer and PhD from the University of Rochester. Sweet is the recipient of honorary Doctorates of Divinity from University of Richmond, Baker University, Lebanon Valley College, Coe College, and Otterbein College.

Selected bibliography
Soul Tsunami (Zondervan, 1999)
The Three Hardest Words In The World To Get Right (WaterBrook Press, 2006)
The Gospel According to Starbucks (WaterBrook Press, 2007)
The Voice from on High (Thomas Nelson, 2007)
The Voice: Genesis (Thomas Nelson, 2008)
The Church of the Perfect Storm (Abingdon, 2008)
11: Indispensable Relationships You Can't Be Without (Cook Communications, 2008)
Postmodern and Wesleyan?: Exploring the Boundaries and Possibilities (Beacon Hill Press, 2009)
So Beautiful (David C Cook, 2009) (978-1434799791)
Jesus Manifesto: Restoring the Supremacy and Sovereignty of Jesus Christ (with Frank Viola) (Thomas Nelson, 2010)
Nudge: Awakening Each Other to the God Who’s Already There (David C. Cook, 2010)
The Seraph Seal (with Lori Wagner) (Thomas Nelson, 2011)
Real Church in a Social Network World: From Facebook to Face-to-Face Faith (WaterBrook Press, 2011) (e-book) (ASIN B004Y89RKI)
I Am a Follower: The Way, Truth, and Life of Following Jesus (Thomas Nelson, 2012)
Viral: How Social Networking is Poised to Ignite Revival (WaterBrook Press, 2012)
What Matters Most: How We Got the Point but Missed the Person (WaterBrook Press, 2012)
The Greatest Story Never Told: Revive Us Again (Abingdon Press, 2012)
Jesus: A Theography (with Frank Viola) (Thomas Nelson, 2012)
From Tablet to Table: Where Community is Found and Identity is Formed (NavPress, 2015)
Jesus Speaks (with Frank Viola) (Thomas Nelson, 2016)
The Well Played Life (Tyndale, 2014) 
Giving Blood: A Fresh Paradigm for Preaching (Zondervan, 2014) 
Me and We (Abingdon Press, 2014)
The Bad Habits of Jesus (Tyndale House, 2016)
Mother Tongue (NavPress, 2017)
Rings of Fire: Walking in Faith Through a Volcanic Future (NavPress, 2019)
St. Is with Lisa Samson (The Salish Sea Press, 2020).

References

External links 
 
 

[the-salish.com]
A Jesus Manifesto for the 21st Century
A Candid Interview with Leonard Sweet
Spirit Venture Ministries
Lead Mentor, Semiotics & Future Studies DMin track at George Fox Evangelical Seminary
Quantum Spirituality e-book by Leonard Sweet
The Dawn Mistaken for Dusk: If God so Loved the World, Why Can't We? e-book by Leonard Sweet

1961 births
Living people
Presidents of United Methodist seminaries
Methodist theologians
Drew University faculty
George Fox University faculty
American university and college faculty deans
Seminary academics
Colgate Rochester Crozer Divinity School faculty
American United Methodists